Meridia may refer to:

 Sibutramine, an orally administered agent for the treatment of obesity
 Meridia (harvestman), a genus in the family Manaosbiidae
 Meridia, a Daedric prince in The Elder Scrolls video games series
 Meridia Land, an agricultural technology  company known for providing land titling and sustainability services